Jeremy LeSueur (born October 5, 1980) is a former American football defensive back in the National Football League.

Early life 
Jeremy LeSueur was born on October 5, 1980 in Holly Springs, Mississippi.

Career
He was drafted by the Denver Broncos in the third round of the 2004 NFL Draft. He played college football at Michigan.

LeSeuer also played for the New York Jets Seattle Seahawks where he had played in the Super Bowl  and Cleveland Browns.

References

1980 births
Living people
People from Holly Springs, Mississippi
American football defensive backs
Michigan Wolverines football players
Denver Broncos players
New York Jets players
Cleveland Browns players